Appaiah Swami or Sadguru Appayya Swami (ಅಪ್ಪಯ ಸ್ವಾಮಿ 1885–1956) (not to be mistaken with Appayya Swamy, a 17th-century Carnatic Musician and scholar of Tamil Nadu) was a Hindu Indian spiritual master who lived in Virajpet town, in Kodagu, Karnataka, India.

Early life 
Appayya Swami was born as Palanganda Appaiah, the son of a Kodava paddy farmer in Kodagu (Coorg) in 1885. Appayya did his schooling in English and Kannada at Central High School, Mercara. Later he entered the Government Service under the Raj. However, he was of a religious bend of mind since childhood, and was inspired by the lives of Ramakrishna Paramhansa and Swami Vivekananda. He sought a spiritual guru, eventually selecting Guru Ramagiri.

Career 
His Guru ordained him and Swamigalu learned and composed several hymns. Through the path of devotion, he attained self-realization. Over time he became a spiritual teacher with several disciples and was hence given the title of Sadguru.

In 1941 he founded a monastery in Virajpet known as Kaveri Ashram after the river goddess Kaveri. His work in sustaining Hindu spirituality and culture in Coorg and its surrounding regions is being carried on by the Kaveri Ashram (also known as Cauvery Ashram ) today. A school is named after him in Somwarpet, Kodagu called Sadguru Appayya Swamy High School.

Death
He died in 1956, aged 71.

Gallery

Bibliography
1. Śrī sadguru appayya vijaya (Kannada) authored by V.S. Rāmakriṣṇa (Śrī Kāvēri Āśrama, 1965) )

2. Śrī sadguru appayya svāmijīyavara ātmakathe mattu sandēśa (Kannada) (Śrīkāvēri Bhakta Jana Saṅgha, 1965)

External links 
1. A disciple of Sadguru Appayya speaks

2. One among several newspaper articles related to Cauvery/Kaveri Ashram

References 

1885 births
1956 deaths
Indian Hindu monks
Kodava people